Camryn Elise "Cam" Wong (born 5 September 2000), also known by the Chinese name Huang Huier, is a Canadian ice hockey player and member of the Chinese national ice hockey team, currently playing with the UConn Huskies women's ice hockey program in the Hockey East (HEA) conference of the NCAA Division I.

Wong represented China in the women's ice hockey tournament at the 2022 Winter Olympics in Beijing and at the 2022 IIHF Women's World Championship Division I Group B.

References

External links
 
 

Living people
2000 births
Canadian expatriate ice hockey players in China
Canadian expatriate ice hockey players in Russia
Canadian expatriate ice hockey players in the United States
Canadian sportspeople of Chinese descent
Canadian women's ice hockey defencemen
Ice hockey players at the 2022 Winter Olympics
Olympic ice hockey players of China
Shenzhen KRS Vanke Rays players
Ice hockey people from Vancouver
UConn Huskies women's ice hockey players